The Teinach is a river of Baden-Württemberg, southwestern Germany. It is a left tributary of the Nagold and flows for 15 kilometres.
It passes through Bad Teinach-Zavelstein.

References

Rivers of Baden-Württemberg
Rivers of the Black Forest
Rivers of Germany